Denmark–Tanzania relations refers to the current and historical relations between Denmark and Tanzania. Denmark has an embassy in Dar Es Salaam. Tanzania is represented in Denmark, through its embassy in Stockholm, Sweden. Tanzania has an honorary consulate in Denmark.

History

Diplomatic relations between Denmark and Tanzania were established in the 1960s. Right after, Denmark made a project in Kibaha. In 1970, the Government of Denmark handed over the project to Julius Nyerere, President of Tanzania.

Assistance to Tanzania
Danish assistance in Tanzania amounted 500 million DKK in 2010. Denmark will focus on these areas: business environment, public health, management of natural resources, budget support, democracy, good governance, Public administration, cooperation between Tanzanian and Danish companies and Refugees. Denmark also supports Burundian and Congolese refugees in Tanzania.

High-level visits
On 5 February 1991, Tanzanian President Julius Nyerere visited the Mellemfolkeligt Samvirke in Denmark.
Danish Prime Minister Anders Fogh Rasmussen visited Tanzania in 2005. Tanzanian President Jakaya Kikwete visited Denmark in 2007, and again on 5 May 2009.

See also 
 Foreign relations of Denmark
 Foreign relations of Tanzania

References

External links

 
Tanzania
Bilateral relations of Tanzania